Willy Huybrechts (born 6 April 1921) was a Belgian sailor. He competed in the 6-Metre event at the 1948 Summer Olympics.

References

External links
 

1921 births
Possibly living people
Belgian male sailors (sport)
Olympic sailors of Belgium
Sailors at the 1948 Summer Olympics – 6 Metre
Sportspeople from Antwerp